Kanawha State Forest is a  recreation area located near the community of Loudendale, West Virginia, which is about  from downtown Charleston, West Virginia, United States. It is managed by the West Virginia Department of Natural Resources.

While still classified as a "state forest", the West Virginia Legislature has directed that the facility be managed as a state park.

The Davis Creek Road entrance to Kanawha State Forest is located at  (38.28133, -81.64169).

Recreational facilities include overnight camping, picnicking, hiking, a public shooting-range, mountain biking, cross-country skiing and a swimming pool and playground.  Several geocaches are located in the forest.

See also
 List of West Virginia state forests

References

External links
 

West Virginia state forests
Protected areas of Kanawha County, West Virginia
National Register of Historic Places in Kanawha County, West Virginia
Campgrounds in West Virginia